Lars Olsen is a former footballer.

Lars Olsen may also refer to:

Lars Olsen (cyclist) (born 1965), Danish cyclist
Lars and Christina Olsen House

See also

Lars Olsson (disambiguation)